Watson Realty Corp. is an independent real estate company headquartered in Jacksonville, Florida, with 51 offices and 1,400 employees in Northeast Florida, Central Florida, and Southeast Georgia.

As part of its global outreach efforts, Watson Realty Corp. is proud to be a member of the Leading Real Estate Companies of the World, a prestigious network of 565 international real estate companies across the globe. In addition, the company maintains an affiliation with the Luxury Portfolio International, which serves as the luxury branch of the Leading Real Estate Companies of the World. Through these affiliations, Watson Realty Corp. is able to connect with a global community of like-minded real estate professionals and bring added value to its clients.

History

Watson Realty Corp. was formed in 1965 by William A. Watson, Jr. The company's first office was located in Jacksonville, as a single-office real estate company in a shared storefront with William A. Watson and one part-time sales agent.

William A. Watson Jr., was born in Jacksonville, the son and grandson of railroad conductors for what today is CSX Corp. The professor, Roger G. Giles, would become one of Watson's early mentors.

After graduation in 1959, Watson joined Gifford Grange Realty in 1960. When Grange left the business to enter politics, Watson opened his own brokerage on the Southside. He offered property management and fire and casualty insurance in addition to real estate services. Watson opened his first branch office in 1970.It would later be renamed a final time to Watson Realty Corp. in 1976. 

By 1979, Watson opened branches in Gainesville, Orlando, Longwood, Deland, and Daytona. In 1985, Watson opened its first office outside of Florida in St. Marys, Georgia.

Watson established its family of service companies in 1994 with the opening of Watson Mortgage Corp. and, in 2002, Watson Title Services of North Florida, Inc.

In 2017, Watson merged with All Florida Realty, offering services to Melbourne, Port St. Lucie, Vero Beach, and Port Charlotte.

Growth
In 1999, Watson Realty Corp. acquired Palm Coast Home Realty. Palm Coast Home Realty was the resale real estate marketing division of ITT Community Development Corp., the initial developer of Palm Coast, a 15,000-home community halfway between St. Augustine and Daytona Beach.

Today
Today, Watson Realty Corp. headquarters are located in Jacksonville at 7821 Deercreek Club Rd. in the Southside area. The company has offices in the Northeast and Central Florida, as well as Southeast Georgia.

The company currently has 51 offices, including the newest location in Lake Nona.

References

Real estate services companies of the United States
Companies based in Jacksonville, Florida